Muhidin Zukić (born 22 September 1971) is a retired Bosnian-Herzegovinian professional footballer that spent his whole career as a member of FK Sarajevo, whom he captained. He received one cap for Bosnia and Herzegovina.

Club career
Zukić started his career at hometown club FK Sarajevo, but did not make it to the first team and joined Rudar Kakanj in 1992, only to return to Sarajevo in 1998.

He scored 14 goals in 298 official matches for FK Sarajevo and scored the opening goal in the 2002 domestic cup final. He start working for the club's football academy in 2013.

International career
He made one appearance for Bosnia and Herzegovina in an August 1999 friendly match away against Liechtenstein.

References

External links

1971 births
Living people
Footballers from Sarajevo
Bosniaks of Bosnia and Herzegovina
Association football central defenders
Yugoslav footballers
Bosnia and Herzegovina footballers
Bosnia and Herzegovina international footballers
FK Sarajevo players
FK Rudar Kakanj players
Premier League of Bosnia and Herzegovina players